The Festival of Lyric Singing is an international festival held in the Peruvian city of Trujillo. This festival takes place in November of every year and it is a competition of singers from several countries. In 2011 the 15th edition of this festival took place.

Description
 
This event features singers international exponents of the lyric mainly from Americas, Asia and Europe, in addition have the presence of teachers and international pianists, It is organized by the Cultural Promotion Center of Trujillo, and it takes place in the Municipal theater of the city during the month of November.

Winners

See also
List of classical music festivals in South America
List of festivals in Peru
Trujillo
Marinera Festival
Trujillo Spring Festival
Las Delicias beach
Huanchaco
Santiago de Huamán
Victor Larco Herrera District

References

External links
Location of Trujillo, place of Singing lyric Festival

Media

Gallery of images
Cultural Promotion Center of Trujillo

Festivals in Trujillo, Peru
Music festivals in Peru
Classical music festivals in Peru